Troy Smith (born July 30, 1977) is a former American football wide receiver. He was drafted by the Philadelphia Eagles in the sixth round of the 1999 NFL Draft and later tore his ligament in his leg on a 14-yard reception thrown by Donovan McNabb in a game. His leg could not be healed, which forced him to discontinue play in the National Football League (NFL).

He played basketball and football at Junius H. Rose High School, and continued playing both sports at East Carolina University (basketball in his freshman year, and football in his sophomore, junior, and senior years). 

He is now the head coach of the Hope Middle School Mustangs football team in Greenville, North Carolina, the same town where he was born and raised.

References

1977 births
Living people
American football wide receivers
East Carolina Pirates football players
Philadelphia Eagles players
Sportspeople from Greenville, North Carolina
Players of American football from North Carolina